The African Union First Colored Methodist Protestant Church and Connection, usually called "the A.U.M.P. Church," is a Methodist denomination. It was chartered by Peter Spencer (1782–1843) in Wilmington, Delaware, in 1813 as the "Union Church of Africans," where it became known as the "African Union Church".

History
In 1866, the First Colored Methodist Protestant Church merged with it. This was a Maryland offshoot of the A.M.E. Church, which was based in Philadelphia, Pennsylvania. The Delaware-Maryland denomination renamed itself, combining names, as the African Union First Colored Methodist Protestant Church and Connection, usually called the A.U.M.P. Church.  In the 1860s, a schism resulted in some of the congregations forming the "Union American Methodist Episcopal Church" in 1865. The two denominations are now referred to collectively as the "Spencer Churches" (or, less often, the "Union Churches").

Although a decentralized Methodist Protestant church in its earlier years, the A.U.M.P. Church in the 1880s began to consider adopting an episcopal structure. In 1922 it consecrated its first bishop, Daniel J. Russell, Jr.  But it was not until 1967 that the Church fully changed to an episcopal structure and consecrated its two leaders as bishops.

The A.U.M.P. Church has a total of about 40 congregations in the area of the mid-Atlantic and Upper South: the states of New York, New Jersey, Pennsylvania, Maryland, Delaware, and the District of Columbia.

Notable churches
Hosanna Meeting House, built in 1845 in the free Black village of Hinsonville, Chester County, Pennsylvania
St. John's Church (Ruxton, Maryland), listed on the National Register of Historic Places (NRHP) in 1982
St. John's African Union Methodist Protestant Church, Goshen, New York, listed on the NRHP in 2010
Saint Paul African Union Methodist Church, Washington, D.C., listed on the NRHP in 2011
Mt. Zion A. U. M. P., Marshalltown, NJ, mother church of the New Jersey and Pennsylvania districts. This is the base of bishop and historian Daniel James Russell. It is classified as a contributing resource in the Marshalltown Historic District, which was listed on the NRHP in July 2013

References

External links
Official site
Russell, Daniel J. History of the African Union Methodist Protestant Church. Philadelphia: Union Star Book and Job Printing Publishing House, 1920. Documenting the American South, University of North Carolina
A.U.M.P. Book of Discipline, 1871, Documenting the American South, University of North Carolina
 Mount Calvary African Union Methodist Protestant Church
Mount Pleasant African Union Methodist Protestant Church

African-American history of Delaware
Historically African-American Christian denominations
Religious organizations established in 1813
Methodism in the United States
Methodist denominations in North America
Christian denominations established in the 19th century
1813 establishments in the United States